The Pearl International Film Festival (PIFF), is an annual film festival held in Kampala, Uganda. It has been described as one of the biggest film events in Uganda. PIFF is a non-governmental organization founded by Moses Magezi and established in 2011 to develop and promote film and other cultural industries as catalyst for the regional social and economic growth. The first edition of PIFF happened at the National Theatre and still will holds other edition every May.

The festival
The annual multi disciplinary arts and cultural festival is PIFF’s major activity; the festival is an all-arts affair, with a week of screenings of the best local cinema and an awarding evening Gala. The festival also aims to draw attention to raise the profile of films with the aim of contributing towards the development of cinema, boosting the film industry worldwide and celebrating Ugandan cinema at currently at the national level.

The PIFF festival now runs 5 programs over a week that include:
 Film Awards
 Film Workshops
 Students Programmes
 Exhibition

During the festival, films are shown in the capital Kampala.

Awards
Best Film
Best Cinematography
Best Documentary
Best Short/Animation
Best Actor Feature
Best Actress Feature
Best Writer
Lifetime Achievement Award
PIFF Award
Best Editor
Best Director
Best Film Journalist
Best Media House
Best Sound
Best Production Design

See also
Cinema of Uganda

References

External links

Organisations based in Kampala
Film festivals in Uganda
May events
Annual events in Uganda
Festivals in Uganda